Ashley Flowers is an American podcaster, writer, and non-profit organization founder. She is best known for the true crime podcast Crime Junkie. In August 2022, Flowers' debut novel, All Good People Here, became a New York Times bestseller.

Early career and personal life 
As a child, Flowers, who read mystery and crime novels such as Nancy Drew books and who watched television shows like Matlock, thought that she might one day have a career as a cold case detective.

Flowers worked in biomedical research and later in sales for a medical device company. During her work commutes, she listened to true crime content, including Serial, a true crime podcast recommended to Flowers by her childhood friend, Brit Prawat. Flowers started working in business development for a software company in 2017.

Ashley Flowers lives in Indiana and works in Indianapolis. Flowers has a daughter, Josie and a dog, Charlie (Chuck), who is the namesake for Flowers' podcast network, audiochuck.

Media career 
Flowers, who worked as a volunteer and then a board member for Crime Stoppers of Central Indiana, was asked how Crime Stoppers might reach a younger audience. Flowers developing Murder Monday, a 20-minute show that aired on a local radio station. Each episode focused on a different case. Flowers hosted Murder Monday for a year and then developed Crime Junkie with Prawat.

Podcasting 
In 2017, Flowers founded a podcast network, Audiochuck LLC, which specializes in true crime podcasts. Flowers invested $13,000 into the company for its initial operation. Flowers then sourced revenue from Patreon members and ads from AdLarge Media.

Crime Junkie 

Ashley Flowers and Brit Prawat have co-hosted Crime Junkie, the flagship podcast of Audiochuck, since 2017. Crime Junkie grew quite popular in its first few years. Flowers and Prawat announced a national tour in July 2019.

In 2019, Flowers and Prawat were accused by multiple parties of plagiarizing other works, including newspaper articles, other podcasts, and an episode of the television show On the Case with Paula Zahn for episodes of Crime Junkie. Some content was read verbatim; in other examples, only a few words were changed. Flowers responded to the claims and legal action taken by The Arkansas Democrat-Gazette by removing at least five episodes of Crime Junkie. Flowers stated to Variety that the episodes' "source material could no longer be found or properly cited". Flowers and Prawat saw negative feedback on Apple Podcasts regarding the absence of attribution on the show. An August 2019 episode of Crime Junkie reportedly cited a dozen sources.

In the spring of 2022, Edison Research found Crime Junkie the second-most-listened-to podcast among American audiences.

In 2021, Flowers brokered a partnership of Audiochuck with SiriusXM. As of July 2022, Audiochuck has a total of 16 podcasts in its network, including Crime Junkie. In February 2022, Ashley Flowers released another podcast within the Audiochuck network called The Deck, which she hosts. Like Crime Junkie, its episodes explore true crime cases such as homicides and missing persons, but focus on cold cases with few leads.

Other podcasts 
CounterClock is a 2020 podcast hosted by Delia D’Ambra and produced by Audiochuck.

Audiochuck's Anatomy of Murder won the Webby Award for People’s Voice Winner in 2022.

Nonprofit and writing work 
In June 2020, Ashley Flowers founded the nonprofit Season of Justice, which provides grants to laboratories for DNA testing to solve cold cases. In 2021, Season of Justice received 501(c)(3) tax-exempt status. As of July 2021, the nonprofit had donated more than $225,000 to families and others involved with 31 cold cases. Season of Justice's work continued into 2022.

In January 2022, Ashley Flowers signed a publishing contract with Bantam Books for her debut novel, All Good People Here, which was co-written with Alex Kiester. Flowers said that a true crime cold case inspired details in her novel, which is set in a small town in Indiana. All Good People Here was released on August 16, 2022, and became a New York Times bestseller. It received a favorable review from Publishers Weekly and was a Publishers Weekly bestseller.

References

External links 
 

American women podcasters
American podcasters
People associated with true crime
Living people
Year of birth missing (living people)